James Vincent de Paul Lafferty, Jr. (1856–1898) was an Irish-American inventor, most famous for his construction of Lucy the Elephant, the Elephantine Colossus and The Light of Asia (also known as "Old Dumbo"). Born to Irish parents in Philadelphia, Pennsylvania, he received Patent Number 268503, on December 5, 1882 to protect his original invention, as well as any animal-shaped building.

Broke by 1887, Lafferty was forced to sell Lucy (originally named "Elephant Bazaar").  He died in 1898 and is buried in the cemetery of St. Augustine's Catholic Church in Philadelphia.

See also
Charles Ribart, French architect who designed a similar elephant-shaped building
Zoomorphic architecture

External links

Official 'Lucy' website

1856 births
1898 deaths
19th-century American inventors